Carabus monilis, the necklace ground beetle, is a species of beetle endemic to Europe, where it is observed in Austria, Belgium, mainland France, Germany, Great Britain including the Isle of Man, the Republic of Ireland, mainland Italy, Liechtenstein, Luxembourg, mainland Norway, mainland Spain, Switzerland, and the Netherlands.

References

monilis
Beetles of Europe
Beetles described in 1792
Taxa named by Johan Christian Fabricius